Einar Borges (16 February 1900 – 26 January 1984) was a Danish wrestler. He competed in the men's Greco-Roman lightweight at the 1928 Summer Olympics.

References

External links
 

1900 births
1984 deaths
Danish male sport wrestlers
Olympic wrestlers of Denmark
Wrestlers at the 1928 Summer Olympics
Sportspeople from Aarhus
20th-century Danish people